Rafael Chaparro Madiedo (born December 23, 1963 in Bogotá, died April 18, 1995 in Bogotá) was a Colombian writer who won Colombia's 1992  National Literature Prize for his only novel Opium in Clouds (Opio en las nubes). Chaparro was influenced by Colombian novelist Andrés Caicedo and by twentieth century American literary and art movements. As a teenager, Chaparro Madiedo graduated from the Colombian-Swiss school Helvetia; he later attended and graduated from the Universidad de los Andes with a B.A. in Philosohy and Literature. His novel Opium in Clouds received little initial literary acclaim outside of the National Literature award, but has been very popular among young adults in Colombia, eventually attaining cult status, and has an extended online fan base. He died of lupus on April 18, 1995.

References

1963 births
People from Bogotá
Colombian male novelists
20th-century Colombian novelists
1995 deaths
20th-century male writers
Deaths from lupus